Marisa Tayui (田結 万里紗) is a Japanese American actress. She appeared in the 2007 film Balls of Fury. She has also made appearances on The Andy Dick Show, Monk, Two and a Half Men, Heroes, MTV Movie Awards 2004, House, and The Bold and the Beautiful. She appeared in the Adam Sandler film Just Go With It.

References

External links 

https://web.archive.org/web/20120315050037/http://www.blockbuster.com/browse/catalog/movieDetails/390850 - Cached
http://www.cbspressexpress.com/div.php/cbs_entertainment/release?id=16122

Living people
American actresses of Japanese descent
Year of birth missing (living people)
Actresses from Fullerton, California
21st-century American women